Matt Clapp (born December 6, 1986) is a former American football fullback. He was signed by the Detroit Lions as an undrafted free agent in 2010. He played college football at Oklahoma.

Professional career

Detroit Lions
Clapp was signed by the Detroit Lions' as an undrafted rookie free agent on April 30, 2010. He was waived by the Lions on September 3, 2011.

Tampa Bay Buccaneers
Clapp was first signed by the Buccaneers on October 26, 2011. On December 11, 2011, he was suspended for the remainder if the 2011 NFL season and the first four games of the 2012 NFL season for unspecified reasons.

References

1986 births
Living people
Players of American football from Phoenix, Arizona
American football fullbacks
Oklahoma Sooners football players
Detroit Lions players
Tampa Bay Buccaneers players